Terry Jackson may refer to:

Terry Jackson (cornerback), former American football cornerback
Terry Jackson (running back), former American football running back
Terri Jackson, executive director of the Women's National Basketball Players Association